was a village located within Nakatado District, Kagawa Prefecture, Japan, from 1890 to 1901.

On February 15, 1890, the village of Zentsūji was formed within Tado District. Tado District merged with Naka District to become Nakatado District on April 1, 1899. Then on November 3, 1901, the village merged with Yoshida and Asano villages, becoming Zentsuji-cho town. The area is now part of Zentsūji.

Dissolved municipalities of Kagawa Prefecture
1890s in Japan